Coconut pudding may refer to 
Cazuela, rich pumpkin and coconut pudding
Coconut bar, Chinese food
Haupia, Hawaiian coconut pudding
Rēti'a, Tahitian coconut pudding
Maja blanca, Filipino dessert
Tembleque, Puerto Rican coconut pudding
Manjar branco, Brazilian coconut pudding
Manjar blanco, variety of milk-based delicacies

Thai coconut pudding (disambiguation)